Abacetus cuneatus is a species of ground beetle in the subfamily Pterostichinae. It was described by Fairmaire in 1887.

References

cuneatus
Beetles described in 1887